Art in Odd Places (AiOP) is a public artproject based in New York City exploring connections between public spaces, pedestrian traffic, and ephemeral transient interventions. It takes place each October.

Background

History 
Founded in 1996 as part of the Cultural Olympiad Public Arts Program of the 1996 Olympics in Atlanta, with a hiatus from 1998 to 2005, AiOP curates one large-scale project each year. During the program New York pedestrians happen upon the artwork by coincidence while others (like a scavenger hunt) use a map to discover art in unexpected places.

Art in Odd Places was founded by Ed Woodham and is directed by Furusho von Puttkammer. It is a current project of GOH Productions.

Mission 
Art in Odd Places aims to stretch the boundaries of communication in the public realm by presenting artworks in all disciplines outside the confines of traditional public space regulations. AiOP reminds us that public spaces function as the epicenter for diverse social interactions and the unfettered exchange of ideas. Projects have included a performance addressing the issues of public vs. private as it applies to the public restroom, to art teams activating space by cleaning the sidewalks of 14th Street in Manhattan. In 2006, Art in Odd Places presented "Imagining New Public Space", a panel to discuss alternative public places for art. The panel was presented in collaboration with Radhika Subramaniam, founder of interdisciplinary art journal, Connect:art.politics.theory.practice and Setha Low, president of the American Anthropological Association, with panelist: Bill Brown of Surveillance Media Players; Clarinda MacLow, choreographer and performer; and Paul Carter, philosopher and artist from the Lab Architecture Studio.

Recent developments
In May 2021, Art in Odd Places (AIOP) 2021: NORMAL launched a series of installations, performances and visual art along 14th Street. It was curated by artist Furusho von Puttkammer and featured Akiko Ichikawa, Gretchen Vitamvas, Johnothon Lyons, Ivan Sikic, Yeseul Song, Yasmeen Abdallah, Julia Justo, Sara Lynne Lindsay and dozens of other artists.

References

Freedom of Expression

External links 
Art in Odd Places website
Time Out New York: "Art in Odd Places is Taking Over 14th Street"
 The Brooklyn Rail: "Pedestrian"

Non-profit organizations based in New York City
Arts organizations based in New York City
Arts organizations established in 1996
1996 establishments in New York (state)
Freedom of expression